The 1949–50 NHL season was the 33rd season of the National Hockey League. The Detroit Red Wings defeated the New York Rangers in seven games for the Stanley Cup. It was the Red Wings' fourth championship.

League business
The NHL decided to increase the number of games played from 60 to 70 games for each team. Each team played every other team 14 times. Goaltenders would no longer have to face a penalty shot if they took a major penalty. A team-mate could serve the penalty in the penalty box.

In June 1949, the NHL decided to henceforth paint the ice surface white. This was done by adding white paint to the water before freezing. Previously, the ice surface was just frozen water on concrete, which made a dull grey colour. By "whitening" the ice surface, it made seeing and following the puck much easier, especially on the relatively new medium of television.

Regular season
Detroit, led by the new Production Line of Lindsay, Abel and Howe won the regular season. The Production line led the league in scoring 1–2–3.

Highlights

On November 2, 1949, at Chicago Stadium, a rather serious brawl broke out in a game Chicago defeated Montreal 4–1. During the second period, some rinkside fans began to get on Montreal defenceman Ken Reardon, and when one fan grabbed his sweater, Reardon swung his stick and hit one of the rowdies. Leo Gravelle and Billy Reay joined in, and yet another fan climbed over the boards and challenged Reardon, but was forced back to his seat. When the game ended, police arrested Reardon, Reay and Gravelle. Later, the players were cleared when a judge ruled that the fans were the aggressors and overstepped the prerogatives as fans.

After Chicago defeated Toronto 6–3 on November 27, Conn Smythe told goaltender Turk Broda, "I'm not running a fat man's team!" and said that Broda would not play until he reduced his weight to 190 lb. At the time, Broda weighed almost 200. Al Rollins was purchased from Cleveland of the AHL and Gil Mayer was brought up for good measure. When he reached 189 pounds, Broda went back into the Toronto net and he gained his fourth shutout of the season December 3 and Maple Leaf fans cheered all of his 22 saves.

After the Red Wings clobbered Chicago 9–2 on February 8, writer Lew Walter tried to interview Chicago coach Charlie Conacher. Conacher exploded in anger, criticized Walter's past stories and punched Walter, knocking him down to the floor. Walter announced that he would seek a warrant for Conacher's arrest. NHL president Clarence Campbell took a dim view of Conacher's actions and fined him $200. Conacher then phoned Walter and apologized, saying he regretted what had taken place.

Montreal fans began to boo Bill Durnan, like they had in 1947–48, despite the fact he was the league's best goalkeeper, and in an interview, he stated he was going to retire at the end of the season. In reality, Durnan had been cut a number of times during the season, and at one point, had to take penicillin. It caused a high fever and he missed some action. Despite this, he recorded eight shutouts and won the Vezina Trophy for the sixth time in his seven-year career.

Ken Reardon got himself into trouble when he made a statement to a magazine suggesting retribution to Cal Gardner, stating: "I'm going to make sure that Gardner gets 14 stitches in his mouth. I may have to wait a long time, but I'll get even." On March 1, 1950, Clarence Campbell made Reardon post a $1,000 bond to make sure he did not carry out his threat. When the season ended, Reardon was refunded the $1,000, since he did not hurt Gardner as he said he would.

Final standings

Playoffs

Playoff bracket

Semifinals
Detroit defeated Toronto in seven games to advance to the Finals; while New York defeated Montreal in five games to also advance to the Finals.

(1) Detroit Red Wings vs. (3) Toronto Maple Leafs

(2) Montreal Canadiens vs. (4) New York Rangers

Stanley Cup Finals

Two games were played in Toronto, with the rest in Detroit, as the circus had taken over Madison Square Garden in New York.

Awards
This was the last season that the O'Brien Cup was awarded to the Stanley Cup runner up – in this season, the New York Rangers – as it went into retirement for the second and final time at season's end. (It was not awarded between 1917 and 1921)

All-Star teams

Player statistics

Scoring leaders
Note: GP = Games played, G = Goals, A = Assists, PTS = Points, PIM = Penalties in minutes

Source: NHL

Leading goaltenders

Note: GP = Games played; Mins – Minutes played; GA = Goals against; GAA = Goals against average; W = Wins; L = Losses; T = Ties; SO = Shutouts

Coaches
Boston Bruins: Georges Boucher
Chicago Black Hawks: Charlie Conacher
Detroit Red Wings: Tommy Ivan
Montreal Canadiens: Dick Irvin
New York Rangers: Lynn Patrick
Toronto Maple Leafs: Hap Day

Debuts
The following is a list of players of note who played their first NHL game in 1949–50 (listed with their first team, asterisk(*) marks debut in playoffs):
Jack McIntyre, Boston Bruins
Red Sullivan, Boston Bruins
Johnny Wilson, Detroit Red Wings
Terry Sawchuk, Detroit Red Wings
Marcel Pronovost*, Detroit Red Wings
Al Rollins, Toronto Maple Leafs
George Armstrong, Toronto Maple Leafs
Tim Horton, Toronto Maple Leafs

Last games
The following is a list of players of note that played their last game in the NHL in 1949–50 (listed with their last team):
Jack Crawford, Boston Bruins
Bud Poile, Boston Bruins
Frank Brimsek, Chicago Black Hawks
Ken Reardon, Montreal Canadiens
Grant Warwick, Montreal Canadiens
Bill Durnan, Montreal Canadiens
Garth Boesch, Toronto Maple Leafs

See also 
 1949-50 NHL transactions
 List of Stanley Cup champions
 3rd National Hockey League All-Star Game
 National Hockey League All-Star Game
 1949 in sports
 1950 in sports

References 
 
 
 
 
 
 

Notes

External links
 Hockey Database
 NHL.com

 
1
1